Sriram Boopathi (born 17 January 1994) is an Indian professional footballer who plays as a midfielder for Chennai City in the I-League.

Career
He made his professional debut for the Chennai City F.C. against Shillong Lajong on 29 December 2018, He started and played full match as Chennai City won 6–1.

Career statistics

References

1994 births
Living people
People from Salem, Tamil Nadu
Indian footballers
Chennai City FC players
Footballers from Tamil Nadu
I-League players
Association football midfielders